Woolnorth / Temdudheker is a rural locality in the local government area of Circular Head in the North-west and west region of Tasmania. The 2016 census has a population of 112 for the state suburb of Woolnorth.

History
Woolnorth / Temdudheker is a confirmed locality.
A property named Woolnorth was established in the area by the Van Diemen's Land Company in 1827. Cape Grim, on the Woolnorth property, was the scene of a massacre of Aboriginals in 1828.

It was officially dual named in March 2021.

Geography
Woolnorth / Temdudheker is a triangular locality with boundaries on the west, north-east and south-east. The Southern Ocean forms most of the western boundary, and Bass Strait the north-eastern. The Woolnorth Wind Farm is in the locality.

Road infrastructure
The C215 route (Harcus River Road) enters from the north-east and follows the south-east boundary to the south, where it exits.

References

Localities of Circular Head Council
Towns in Tasmania